Greenwald is a surname. Notable people with the surname include:

 Alex Greenwald (born 1979), American musician and actor
 Andy Greenwald (born 1977), social commentator, specifically about popular music
 Bruce Greenwald (born 1946), American economist
 Douglas Greenwald (1913–1997), American economist
 Glenn Greenwald (born 1967), attorney, journalist, blogger, author of books, NSA critic
 Hank Greenwald (born 1935), former baseball announcer
 Herbert Greenwald (1915–1959), real estate developer associated with Mies van der Rohe
 Jeff Greenwald (born 1954), author, performer, and Executive Director of Ethical Traveler
 Joseph Greenwald (actor) (circa 1878–1938), American actor
 Louis Greenwald (born 1967), New Jersey, USA politician
 Maggie Greenwald (born 1955), American film director and writer
 Michael Greenwald, birth name of Michael Kidd (1915–2007), American film and stage choreographer
 Nora Greenwald (born 1977), also known as Molly Holly, American professional wrestler
 Robert Greenwald (born 1945), American film director, film producer, and political activist
 Rabbi Moshe Greenwald (1853–1911), Rabbi of Chust, Hungary, and author of Arugas Habosem
 Rabbi Eliezer David Greenwald (1867–1928), Rabbi of Satmar, and author of Keren LeDovid
 Rabbi Yaakov Yechezkiya Greenwald (1882–1941), Rabbi of Pápa, Hungary and author of Vayageid Yaakov
 Leopold Greenwald (1888–1955), Rav, Congregation Beth Jacob, Columbus, Ohio
 Rabbi Yosef Greenwald (1903–1984), Grand Rebbe of Pupa and author of Vaychi Yosef
 Rabbi Yaakov Yechezkia Greenwald II (b. 1948), present Grand Rebbe of Pupa, Williamsburg, Brooklyn

Other uses 
 Greenwald, Minnesota
 Greenwald, Pennsylvania

See also 
 
 Grunewald (disambiguation)
 Grunwald (disambiguation)
 Grunwald (surname)
 Grünwald (disambiguation)